is a Japanese song released on March 3, 1999. The song caused a social phenomenon in Japan. On the Japanese Oricon weekly single charts, it debuted at the number-one position with the sales of over one million copies. It was considered that the song might surpass the record of "Oyoge! Taiyaki-kun". However, it spent at the top position for only three consecutive weeks. In fact, this song proved that "Oyoge! Taiyaki-kun" had been extraordinary. According to the Oricon, it sold over 2.91 million copies, becoming the third best-selling single in Japan at that time. However, Southern All Stars's "Tsunami" surpassed the record in 2005.

See also
 List of best-selling singles in Japan

References

1999 singles
Oricon Weekly number-one singles
1999 songs
Pony Canyon singles